Saarjärv Landscape Conservation Area is a nature park in Jõgeva County, Estonia.

The area of the nature park is 159 ha.

The protected area was founded in 1968 to protect Saare Lake and Saare forest.

References

Nature reserves in Estonia
Geography of Jõgeva County